The Princeton University Band serves as the marching band and pep band of Princeton University. Like most other Ivy League bands, it is a scramble band. To members and fans, it is often known as the PUB (pronounced Pea You Bee) or simply The Band. Many alumni refer to it as the Tiger Band.

Overview

History

Foundation and early history
The modern Princeton University Band was established in October 1919 when a group of undergraduate musicians decided that a regular musical presence was needed at Palmer Stadium, home of Princeton's multi-time national champion football team; however, these events were in many ways merely a reorganization of the preexisting R.O.T.C. Band that had served a much smaller role on campus several years earlier, making Princeton's Band one of the oldest of its kind in the country.  Some of the band traveled to perform at the Yale Bowl for the season's only away game, beginning a long tradition of the PUB attending all football games, home and away.

For over a decade, the PUB performed on a tight budget, clad only in black sweaters with bow-ties and white pants; however, thanks to the contributions of many alumni supporters in 1936, the band was able to afford new instruments, music, and, most notably, new uniforms — black blazers with orange collars and a Princeton Band insignia on the breast pocket.

In 1937, the PUB expanded its role at Princeton by playing not only during football games, but also basketball and ice hockey.  By the 1940s, they were playing at nearly all home basketball and hockey contests, as well as at several lacrosse matches and in some more formal spring concerts.

A change in style and increased national profile
The 1950s witnessed an era of great transition for the band.  Gradually, the band changed from a corps-style band to today's scramble band.  Some alumni recall seeing the band scramble without spoken accompaniment as early as 1938, and records of scrambling exist as early as 1941. In 1955, the band began experimenting with comedic scripts to go along with the halftime scrambles.  The first script on record was in a home opener against Rutgers University in 1955, by which time scrambling was a well-established feature of field performances.  However, the band didn't entirely stop marching until the 1970s.  In 1952, the band switched from black to orange-and-black plaid blazers and continued to wear the straw hats that had been introduced a year or two earlier.  With this change, the band started the tradition of wearing colorful formal wear on the field — something that has since been emulated by every Ivy League band at one point or another, as well as those of Stanford, Virginia, Rutgers, and Rice. The trendsetting new uniform was even featured on the cover of the October 1955 issue of Sports Illustrated.

From 1949 to 1981, the PUB did not miss a single football game.  At 32 years and 293 games, this is one of the longest streaks in the history of college marching bands, passed only by the current holder of consecutive games attended, USC's Spirit of Troy.  The PUB has never missed a home game in its near-century of existence.

The PUB's halftime format has caused problems over the years.  Not only have a number of institutions banned it from performing, like the United States Military Academy at West Point and, until recently, Lafayette College, but there was serious talk in the 1970s and '80s of disbanding the group at Princeton.

Today

To placate the concerns of administrators and alumni at Princeton, the PUB hired Jack Hontz, a marching band director from Strath Haven High School in Pennsylvania, as a musical advisor.  The brother of a former band member, Hontz helped the band make the most out of its musical performances and steered the band away from behavior that may have attracted the ire of the university.  While very helpful, Hontz filled only a consultory role for the PUB until his death in the summer of 2017, offering advice only when it was needed and leaving all leadership and decision-making responsibilities to the students.

As Princeton football became less nationally competitive in the latter half of the 20th century, the PUB began to focus on basketball, ice hockey, and lacrosse, following many teams to NIT, ECAC-HL, and NCAA tournaments, including several national championships, since as early as 1965.  From 1990 to 2000 the PUB played at over twenty NCAA tournaments alone, including the 1998 field hockey national championship.

Organization

The PUB is a recognized student organization of Princeton University and is almost entirely run by a twelve-member officer corps consisting of the President, Drum Major, Head Manager ("Mom"), Student Conductor (the "SC"), Treasurer, four Drillmasters ("DMs"), Alumni Coordinator and two Librarians ("Libes"). A professional music advisor, paid out of the band's operating fund, is the only non-student involved in directing the band.

During the fall football season, the band performs at all Princeton home games and all away games to which it is allowed by the host institution.  At each game, besides playing in the stands during pauses in the game, the band performs a pregame show and a halftime show, each of which consists of one to three songs with accompanying formations, accompanied by a humorous script. The PUB also has a repertoire of cheers which are invoked throughout the game - often mildly offensive, but amusing nonetheless.

Like every other Ivy League scramble band, the PUB has a section of unusual instruments, which the PUB calls "trash percussion."

Every Halloween, the band is invited to participate in the Greenwich Village Halloween Parade, to which it is particularly well suited thanks to its orange and black uniforms and colorful performance techniques.  The band has also made appearances in a number of other parades including the South Amboy St. Patrick's Day Parade, the Gross National Parade, and Philadelphia's Independence Day Parade.

After the conclusion of the football season, the Band transforms into a pep band and plays in the stands at as many Princeton men's and women's hockey, basketball, and lacrosse games as possible, including some away games. The band makes an annual trip to Penn's Palestra for the Princeton-Penn game, as well as occasional trips to nearby schools such as Columbia, Yale, Brown, and even Cornell for basketball and hockey contests. As Princeton's basketball and hockey teams are often among the best in their respective conferences, the band regularly travels with the teams to post season tournaments. Other than the absence of scrambling and formations, the Band's presence at these events is much the same as at football games.

At the end of the academic year, the band remains on campus for Reunions, a three-day celebration of Princetonians past and present.  Since 1936 the band has led the annual P-Rade, a parade of alumni that begins with the University President, the oldest alumnus, the band, and the 25th reunion class.

Uniforms

"Full uniform"
The standard full uniform of the PUB, used for football season, parades, Princeton Reunions, and other formal events, consists of black pants, white shoes, a white dress shirt with solid black tie, Italian "boater" hat, and the distinctive orange-and-black plaid jacket.  The drum major and student director wear white pants, long-tailed dinner jackets and bow ties.  The plaid wool used in the uniforms was custom manufactured and donated by a Princeton alumnus in 1952 at Bennington Mills in Vermont.  As such, the band owns the exclusive rights to the particular plaid design found on the jackets.

Off-season uniform
In 2001, the band had custom orange-and-black striped rugby shirts made for use at home basketball and hockey games.  Prior to this, the band wore its signature hats and jackets with blue jeans and T-shirts for winter sports, something that is still done for away and major home basketball and hockey games, lacrosse games and other spring performances today.

Also, graduating seniors find a way to adorn their beer jackets with the plaid in some fashion, making alums of the band easy to spot.

Incidents, banishments, and arrests
2008

On September 20, 2008, The Princeton University Band traveled to Charleston, SC for Princeton Football's opening game against The Citadel.  The morning of the game, the entire corps of cadets confronted the band during their traditional campus march around, which was pre-approved by The Citadel administration. In an attempt to defuse the tense situation, the band "scrambled," which led to a number of physical altercations between Princeton Band members and Citadel cadets. The problems started as the band marched to the game. The Princeton musicians accidentally "scrambled" onto revered Citadel land (the "Avenue of Remembrance," a campus street that honors the college's war dead) and, coupled with "humor" of questionable taste and quality, managed to seriously provoke the Charleston cadets. The situation escalated rapidly. During the brief scuffle that ensued, some hats were stolen and a clarinet was broken.  After only a few moments, Citadel administrators intervened and invited the Princeton Band to continue their campus march around.

Later that day during the game, the Princeton Band performed one of their characteristic halftime shows that had been approved and censored by both Princeton University and Citadel administrators.  Despite these precautions, the large student section booed loudly during the entirety of the field performance, and many students, alumni, and other fans were offended by the band's unique brand of humor.

During the second half, approximately fifty cadets left the Citadel student section to surround and heckle the Princeton Band.  After stern admonitions from Citadel administrative officers, the students returned to the student section.  The band inadvertently performed Princeton music while Citadel cadets were ceremonially folding the American flag after the game. This only inflamed the anger of the cadets.

The Cadets' behavior prompted apologies from numerous persons affiliated with The Citadel including President Gen Rosa, (who didn't apologize and actually noted he "can certainly appreciate the enthusiasm," by the cadets), Lt Col Graham, the student body president, and many alumni and Charleston residents. The Band suffered no negative consequences.

2006
After performing in the lobby of the Statler Hotel, the Band President was taken to Cornell's Public Safety Department and interrogated.  The Band has been only begrudgingly welcomed back to Cornell in years since.

2005
Having arrived in New York City early for the Greenwich Village Halloween Parade, the Band decided to perform in the library at New York University (NYU).  Security guards detained the Conductor for several minutes and dialed the NYPD.  He was promptly released with no consequences.

2004
After performing in the library at the University of San Diego before the Princeton vs USD football game, the band's leaders were confronted by Public Safety officers wearing shorts.  The Band suffered no repercussions.

2003
During a performance in Harvard's Fogg Art Museum, a band member "lobstered" on the museum curator's desk, which was supporting a piece of artwork undergoing restoration.  Later that day, Harvard Public Safety officers came to Harvard Stadium to detain the President and the guilty band member for questioning.  Harvard and Princeton University Presidents Larry Summers and Shirley Tilghman traded heated letters.  The Band suffered no negative consequences.

2001
 A band member is arrested for stealing a green blazer from the Dartmouth Band.  Ironically, the Dartmouth Band bailed him out of jail.  No charges were filed.

1993
 The band plays "The national anthem... of France" during their pre-game show and pokes fun at Lafayette with a flurry of France jokes. Lafayette is not amused and does not allow the PUB to Lafayette for the next 14 years.

1981
 After a football victory, the Band marched down the middle of the street in parade formation.  The Drum Major, Steve Teager '82, was arrested for parading without a license, and then-Governor of New Jersey Brendan Byrne '49 officially pardoned him.
 The Band is prohibited from attending the football game at West Point Military Academy on October 17, because it was not considered appropriate entertainment.  This broke the band's 32-year streak of unmissed Princeton football games.  The band had not missed a game, home or away, since 1949 — approximately 293 games, which may be the longest continuous streak in the history of collegiate athletics.  During the game, the Band listened on the radio from its practice field and performed their halftime show for a crowd of Princeton students and spectators. The following year, when West Point played at Princeton, the Band ended its halftime show with a tongue-in-cheek version of "Duty, Honor, Country," a musical adaptation of an address by General of the Army Douglas MacArthur to the cadets of West Point and marched off the field with corncob pipes.

1967
 After begging the network to air their halftime show, ABC hesitantly televises the beginning of the Princeton Band's show against Harvard.  The first formation was "ABC," which promptly switched to "NBC."  The network was extremely unhappy and did everything it could to prevent the Band from ever being televised again.  The Band for years was known as "the band that no one dares televise." 

1959
 During its Penn halftime show, a tribute to Liz Taylor, the PUB called the star "Elizabeth Trailer" and characterized her as a home-wrecker by forming a triangle after referencing her "present husband and his wife," which prompted the threat of legal action from her lawyers.  Upon the advice of Princeton's legal counsel, the band sent Taylor a dozen roses, and all charges were dropped.

Traditions

Double-Double Rotating P

Traditionally, the PUB ends its football pregame shows with a formation known as the "Double-Double Rotating P." The formation is a large outline letter "P" comprising an outer loop in a "P" shape and a smaller inner loop forming the interior of the letter. In this formation, the PUB plays the march "Going Back to Nassau Hall." When the band reaches the trio, the P itself remains stationary, but the members of the band start to move around the perimeter of the P, with the outer loop moving clockwise and the inner loop moving counterclockwise. The band plays the trio twice, and upon beginning the second time through the trio, the two loops reverse their respective directions.

At home games, this performance immediately leads into performance of The Star-Spangled Banner.

Fountain Gigs

After football victories at Princeton Stadium,  the Band goes to the fountain at the Princeton School of Public and International Affairs and plays a concert from inside. Before 2012, this would occur regardless of the game's outcome if the Brown University Band were present at Princeton.

The White Castle Meat Product Tolerance Marathon

At the conclusion of each school year, the band takes a trip to White Castle and holds an eating contest.  No time limits are enforced.  Whoever can eat the most Slyders is named King of the Castle for that year.  The top-eating girl is referred to as Queen of the Castle.  Style points are awarded for some eating methods, including:
Stacking two burgers and eating them simultaneously (Two-at-a-Time, Three-at-a-Time, etc.)
Stuffing the entire burger in your mouth and swallowing it (the White Castle Chug)

The current record holder is Kyle (jonkyleg) Goldman '19 who in 2017 ate a recorded 36 sliders in one sitting.

Awards

The Band is famous for its irreverent antics and illicit behavior. As an incentive to motivate members to maintain this tradition, the band has for many years presented several awards to its members commemorating a variety of outrageous acts:

Current Awards
Arther H. Osborn, Class of 1907, Senior Award for Dedication & Service to the Band - a large trophy-cup given to the senior or seniors who have not been band officers, but have demonstrated exceptional service and dedication to the band during their undergraduate years.
Turkey of the Year - awarded to the member that has exercised the worst judgment in an official, band-related capacity that year.  From the late '70s until 2009, a turkey-shaped certificate was passed down.  Now the award has taken the form of the clarinet broken at The Citadel mounted on a commemorative plaque.
Grossest Member - an award, in the form of a rancid drink, given to the member who has done the "grossest" thing at an official band event that year. It is now customary to drink or chug as much of the award itself as possible upon receipt.
Freshman Lush - "The Little Whizzer" statue is passed down each year to the freshman who best exemplifies the spirit of the band while intoxicated most frequently.
Freshman Lushless - an award given to the freshman that best exemplifies the spirit of the band without indulging in alcohol.
Retired Awards
Mickey Mouse - a position offered to the most enthusiastic freshman during football season. It was the Mickey Mouse's job to entertain the band as they entered the stadium.
T&A - an honor bestowed upon the most attractive freshman female member.
Charms - intended for use on a pocket-watch chain, charms of gold, silver, and bronze were given to members in recognition of their service to the band during the first half of the twentieth century.

Favorite songs
Princeton Songs
The Princeton Cannon Song
Going Back to Nassau Hall
Princeton Forward March
Tiger Rag
"The Tigers" (March) Words by Lee B. Woodcock; Arranged by W. C. O'Hare; Original Copyright 1904 by M. Witmark, Sons;
The Princeton University Band March
Here Comes That Tiger
Princeton's Sons (Class of 1907 Song)
The Orange & The Black
Old Nassau
Chuck Mangione's Grammy-winning theme to "The Children of Sanchez"
"Rock Lobster" - traditionally, at a certain point in this song, band members lie down on the ground and wave their legs like lobsters, a perennial crowd-pleaser.
Tequila, by The Champs
"Kiss 'Em Goodbye" follows "Old Nassau" after every victory.
"Welcome to the Jungle," by Guns N' Roses, is played before every home basketball game as a reference to the "Jadwin Jungle" student section.
The theme from Underdog is played during every NCAA tournament game when Princeton is lower seeded and winning.
"We Are the Champions," by Queen, is played after every Ivy or ECAC-HL championship victory.

The Band's repertoire includes dozens of other songs, principally featuring classic rock and, more recently, '90s hits.

The Princeton University Band March

The lyrics to the band's theme song:

Discography
Memories of Princeton Vol 1 - undated
Princeton University Band - 1927
Princeton Symposium of Music - undated (1940s)
Rally Songs by the Princeton University Band - 1947
Songs of Princeton: In Praise of Old Nassau - 1951
Band - Tiger Tones, Boomerangs, etc. - 1955
Going Back: The Songs of the Ivy League - 1960
Traditional Songs of Princeton - 1962
Princeton University Band (shield album) - 1978
Going Back... Marching Forward - 1985
The Orange and the Black - 1989
 Goin' Back: Songs of Old Nassau - 1994
Songs to Beat Yale By - 2000
The Princeton University Band (The Plaid Album) - 2007
Songs in the Key of LOUD - 2011
The Good, the Plaid, and the Ugly - 2015
Plaid to the Bone - 2019

In the media
The PUB has an ongoing presence in, of all media outlets, Sports Illustrated.  Among the highlights:
The PUB appeared on the cover of the October 17, 1955 issue. 
After Princeton's stunning knockout of the UCLA men's basketball team in the 1996 NCAA tournament, SI wrote "If there really is a hoop heaven, the house band would be Princeton's, troubadours in straw hats who played the theme from "Underdog" late in the Tigers' victory."
More recently the PUB was cited in the on-line version of SI.  Paul Zimmerman, in his column of February 26, 2004, claimed "for years, the fastest rendition [of the Star-Spangled Banner] I regularly clocked was that of the Princeton band. Always around 53 seconds."
The Band won ESPN's Battle of the Marching Bands in 1996, beating the Stanford Band, another scramble band, in the final round.  The other competitors in this online poll were: Rice, Wisconsin, Ohio State, Grambling, Michigan, Stanford, and Texas A&M.  It is suspected, though unconfirmed, that the Band won partly due to very strong voting in their favor by bands previously eliminated who did not want any of their rival bands to win.  None of Princeton's rival bands were in the competition, therefore the PUB was something of a neutral choice.
The Band has been on national television playing for the Princeton University basketball teams at the NCAA tournament.  In 2010, they followed the women's team to Tallahassee as they took on St. Joseph's in the first round.
The Band has also made television appearances at the NCAA Men's Ice Hockey Tournament. They played at Princeton's first-round loss to the Bulldogs of University of Minnesota Duluth at Minneapolis in 2009 and the year before when they lost to University of North Dakota Fighting Sioux in Madison, as well as at Princeton's first-round loss to Ohio State in Allentown, PA in 2018.

Alumni and friends

Friends of Tiger Band (FOTB) is the official organization for alumni and other supporters of the PUB.  Proving that the PUB is forever, band members automatically become members of FOTB upon graduation.  FOTB has three key functions:  (1) hosting Band Reunions following the Home Big Three game and the P-Rade, (2) publishing the FOTB newsletter, and most importantly (3) providing support, both financially and in dealings with the University administration.

Notable alumni

Kit Bond A.B. 1960 - (band member) The former United States Senator from Missouri
Dr. Adam Ruben A.B. 2001 - (drum major, mellophone) Biologist and comedian on Food Network's Food Detectives
Brittany Haas A.B. 2009 - (quad toms, fiddle) Fiddler and member of the band Crooked Still.
Robert Sour A.B. 1925, who went on to co-write lyrics to jazz ballad Body & Soul and become president at BMI, did not play in the band as a Princeton student (he was a pianist); however, he was very involved as an alumnus, offering support and writing songs for the band.

References

External links
Princeton University Band
Princeton University

Scramble bands
Princeton University
College marching bands in the United States
Musical groups established in 1919
1919 establishments in New Jersey